Heysham Port is a railway station on the Morecambe Branch Line, which runs between  and Heysham Port. It is owned by Network Rail and managed by Northern Trains.

History

Early years
The station was opened as Heysham Harbour by the Midland Railway on 11 July 1904. It was relocated to an adjacent site on 4 May 1970, and served boat trains for Belfast until the closure of the ferry route in April 1975. The train service was withdrawn on 6 October 1975, but reinstated, and the station renamed Heysham Sea Terminal on 11 May 1987, to provide a rail connection with the daily sailing to Douglas run by the Isle of Man Steam Packet Company. The station was renamed Heysham Port on 28 September 1992, under the Regional Railways sector of British Rail.

As constructed, the station had three platforms, two signal boxes and an extensive goods depot and associated sidings to service the port complex (which dates from 1904).  It handled a range of freight for export including livestock, parcels and fuel oil from a distribution terminal operated by Shell.  None of these types of traffic have been handled here since the early 1980s - all freight through the port, mainly containers, is worked by road.

A frequent passenger service was provided by the Midland Railway for its work force at the port and the regular ferry sailings to Scotland, the Isle of Man and Northern Ireland. Four years after opening, the MR used the line as a test track for a pioneering system of electrification, utilising a trio of purpose-built 3-car Electric Multiple Units powered by an overhead catenary carrying alternating current at 6600V, 25 Hz. Stock for the line was built at the company's  works and power was provided from their power plant at the harbour.

With two reversals required en route and a relatively short journey between termini, the units were well suited for the busy route, which operated on a half-hourly frequency for much of the day. Long-distance express trains routed by way of the former "Little" North Western Railway main line from  via  also used the station. The most notable was a daily through train to/from London St Pancras via  connecting with the ferry to Belfast.  After the 1923 Grouping, the station and port came under the control of the London, Midland and Scottish Railway. The company developed traffic but made alterations to the passenger services, replacing the St Pancras service with one from London Euston via  and the West Coast Main Line and added a second regular boat service to and from Manchester Victoria. Services ran to and from Leeds and through carriages were provided for St Pancras passengers in summer until the onset of World War II. The station was host to three LMS camping coaches in 1934, 12 in 1935 and 36 from 1936 to 1939.

Decline and withdrawal of passenger services
Nationalisation in January 1948 saw the London Midland Region of British Railways take over the running of the line. British Railways withdrew the old Midland EMUs in 1951 and, two years later, replaced them with three elderly ex-LNWR sets formerly used on the West London Line service between Earls Court and Willesden Junction (a fourth set was added in 1957). The power feed was adjusted to use an alternating frequency of 50 Hz rather than 25 Hz. The units remained in use until after the Beeching Report in 1963, which recommended that services over the former NWR/Midland route from Lancaster be withdrawn and the line closed. Services to Morecambe would be retained, but only in connection with sailings to Douglas and Belfast and were to be diesel-worked.

The proposals were approved in August 1965, and the local service was withdrawn on 3 January 1966. Freight traffic continued although from June 1967, it operated via Morecambe, where all trains had to reverse.

A further change to traffic patterns came about in 1968, when ferry operator Sealink announced its intention to convert the two ships operating out of the port on the Belfast route to "roll-on/roll-off" car ferries rather than conventional passenger ships. The change required major alterations to the ferries and to the berths at both termini. At Heysham, the station building was demolished and its replacement built on an adjacent site. The station reopened for traffic on 4 May 1970. As part of the scheme, a new signal box and associated signalling was provided. The viability of the Belfast route was compromised by the Northern Irish Troubles in the years that followed. Mounting losses led to its withdrawal on 5 April 1975 and led the connecting rail services becoming redundant and to the closure of the station to passengers, a few months later.

Freight traffic continued but was only a fraction of what had been handled previously and BR rationalised the station layout, mothballing the signal box, removing the signalling and disconnecting one of the two approach lines from Heysham Moss in 1977. The remaining line was operated under "One Train Working" regulations, with the box acting as a ground frame for controlling the points to the sidings. The disused station had two platform lines accessible for use by railtours and special trains. By 1983, oil trains had ceased and the terminal sidings were then lifted.

Modern era

Passenger trains resumed in 1987, and in 1994, the layout was rationalised again as part of the programme of works associated with the building of the current Morecambe station. The last portion of double track on the branch from Holt Bank Junction to the former ICI sidings at Heysham Moss was singled, redundant trackwork was removed, and the old signal box dismantled (it was subsequently donated to the heritage Dean Forest Railway and has been restored and rebuilt at ). After the work was completed, all that remained was the single line from Morecambe running into the one active platform and a private siding connection laid in the early 1970s into Heysham power station. Much of the land occupied by the old goods yard and disused platforms is used by the Port of Heysham's owners, Peel Ports as secure parking for HGVs waiting for ferries.

The branch handles occasional freight trains operated by Direct Rail Services from the reprocessing plant at Sellafield to Heysham nuclear power station. They usually run once or twice-weekly and use the siding that diverges from the main running line a short distance east of the station. Access is by means of a ground frame unlocked and operated by the train crew and the trains are usually worked with a locomotive at each end to avoid the need for run-round moves when it reverses at Morecambe.

Facilities
The facilities at the station are basic: it is unstaffed and a single waiting shelter is provided. All tickets must be purchased in advance or on board the train. There is step-free access from the ferry terminal and car park to the platform.

Most passengers using the station do so only to connect with the daily ferry sailings as there is no local commuter or residential traffic.

Services

A twice-daily service formerly served the railway station (the first around midday with a second approximately an hour later), which connected with the Isle of Man Steam Packet Company's ferry service to Douglas on the Isle of Man. The services were operated by Northern as an extension of the Lancaster-Morecambe shuttle, but in the late 1980s and early 1990s, one train ran through to/from Manchester Victoria via . A Sunday service ran during the summer months. A Sunday service (of two trains each way) operated in the summer months (mid-May until mid-September).

From the summer 2018 timetable change the service has been altered again, now running to and from Lancaster only. The Sunday service has been reduced to a single train each way, but runs throughout the year and operates to/from Leeds.

References

Sources

External links 
 
 

Railway stations in Lancaster
DfT Category F1 stations
Former Midland Railway stations
Railway stations in Great Britain opened in 1904
Railway stations in Great Britain closed in 1970
Railway stations opened by British Rail
Railway stations in Great Britain opened in 1970
Railway stations in Great Britain closed in 1975
Railway stations in Great Britain opened in 1987
Northern franchise railway stations
Railway stations serving harbours and ports in the United Kingdom
Reopened railway stations in Great Britain